is a railway station on the Fujikyuko Line in the city of Tsuru, Yamanashi, Japan, operated by Fuji Kyuko (Fujikyu).

Lines

Station layout

The station is staffed and consists of two side platforms serving two tracks, with the station building located on the south (down) side. Passengers cross the tracks via a footbridge. It has toilet facilities.

Adjacent stations

History
Kasei Station opened on 19 June 1929.

Passenger statistics
In fiscal 1998, the station was used by an average of 737 passengers daily.

Surrounding area
 Mount Takagawa
 Kasei No. 1 Elementary School

See also
 List of railway stations in Japan

References

External links

 Fujikyuko station information 

Railway stations in Yamanashi Prefecture
Railway stations in Japan opened in 1929
Stations of Fuji Kyuko
Tsuru, Yamanashi